Tom Williams or Tommy Williams may refer to:

Sports

Football and rugby
Tom Williams (American football coach) (born 1969), American former head football coach at Yale University
Tom Williams (defensive lineman) (born 1948), American football defensive end
Tom Williams (Australian footballer, born 1876) (1876–1938), Australian rules footballer for Essendon
Tommy Williams (Australian footballer) (1909–1990), Australian rules footballer for Fitzroy
Tom Williams (Australian footballer, born 1986), Australian rules footballer for Western Bulldogs
Tommy Williams (footballer, born 1929) (1929–1979), English footballer for Tranmere Rovers
Tommy Williams (footballer, born 1935) (1935–1967), English professional footballer
Tommy Williams (footballer, born 1957), Scottish footballer
Tom Williams (footballer, born 1980), English-Cypriot football player
Tom Williams (rugby union, born 1860) (1860–1913), Welsh international rugby player and sports administrator
Tom Williams (rugby union, born 1887) (1887–1927), Welsh rugby union player
Tom Williams (rugby union, born 1983), English rugby union player
Tom Williams (rugby union, born 1991), Welsh rugby union player
Tom Williams (rugby union, born 1996), British born-Welsh rugby union player

Other sports
Tom Williams (outfielder/pitcher) (1870–1940), baseball player
Tom Williams (pitcher) (1896–1937), Negro leagues baseball player
Tom Williams (ice hockey, born 1940) (1940–1992), American professional hockey player, 1961–1976
Tom Williams (ice hockey, born 1951), Canadian professional hockey player, 1971–1979
Tom Williams (racing driver), former American racing driver in 1982 24 Hours of Le Mans
Tom Williams (swimmer), American freestyle swimmer, participated in Swimming at the Pan American Games
Tom Williams (cricketer) (born 1992), English cricketer
Tom Williams (boxer), see Ezra Sellers

Arts and entertainment 
Tom Williams (actor) (born 1929), American actor, Life with Lucy, Quack Pack and Return to the Planet of the Apes
Tommy Williams (musician), jazz double bassist
Tom Williams (music), co-founder of Attic Records
Tom Williams (presenter) (born 1970), Australian television presenter
Tom J Williams (born 1992), Australian Idol contestant
Tommy Williams, fictional character in Babes on Broadway
Tommy Williams, fictional character in The Shawshank Redemption

Politics 
Tom Williams, Baron Williams of Barnburgh (1888–1967), British Labour Party politician, MP 1922–1959
Tommy Williams (Queensland politician) (1886–1970), Australian politician
Tommy Williams (Texas politician) (born 1956), Republican member of the Texas Senate
Tommie Williams, American politician in Georgia

Others 
Tom Williams (Irish republican) (1923–1942), IRA member who was hanged
Tom Williams (auxiliary bishop of Liverpool) (born 1948), British Roman Catholic bishop
Tommy Williams (serial killer) (born 1970), South African serial killer

See also
Thomas Williams (disambiguation)